Filoteia (before 1922: Κουζούσιανη - Kouzousiani) is a village in Pella regional unit, Macedonia, Greece.

Filoteia had 647 inhabitants in 1981. In fieldwork done by Riki Van Boeschoten in late 1993, Filoteia was populated by Slavophones and a Greek population descended from Anatolian Greek refugees who arrived during the Greek-Turkish population exchange. The Macedonian language was spoken by people over 60, mainly in private. A mosque used to exist in the village, later destroyed.

References

Populated places in Pella (regional unit)